University College Bedër is a private non-profit   university in Tirana, Albania. It was established in 2011 by the Muslim Community of Albania, thus completing the education cycle started with the reopening of the madrasas in 1991.

At the Webometrics Ranking of World Universities, Beder University is ranked as the fifth university in Albania.

BU is a coed institution. It offers Bachelor, Master of Science and Professional master's degrees in English and Albanian. Two bachelor programs are 100% English. On June 3 of 2013 Beder signed a Memorandum of Understanding with University of Tirana. They have started the construction of their modern campus in Sauk.

The current rector is Prof. Dr. Gjergj Sinani.

See also
List of universities in Albania

References

Universities in Albania